Doosan Lentjes GmbH is a subsidiary of Doosan Heavy Industries & Construction. It is a company specialized in engineering, design and construction business that provides proprietary waste-to-energy and sewage sludge services and technologies, circulating fluidized bed (CFB) boiler technologies and air quality control systems (AQCS) to the thermal power generation, industrial and municipal sectors.

Doosan Lentjes' main headquarters are located in Ratingen, Germany.

The company was founded as a boiler manufacturing company by Ferdinand Lentjes, in 1928.

Company products and services

Waste-to-energy
Doosan Lentjes designs and builds processes and technologies for the waste-to-energy sector. Around 77 Doosan Lentjes units are in operation around the world, converting more than 9 million tonnes of waste to energy every year.

The company specializes in bespoke-air and water-cooled grate combustion chamber systems tailored to the precise waste types (volume, calorific value and moisture content) incinerated by the plant. To meet strict emissions regulations requirements, Doosan Lentjes developed the Circoclean® dry flue gas cleaning system, based on fluidized bed technology.

The company also offers precision steam turbines  from partner business Doosan Škoda Power. These turbines are capable of operating efficiently at varying levels of heat and steam, to enhance the efficiency of waste-to-energy units.
Doosan Lentjes' waste-to-energy projects include:
Delivering boilers for a new waste-to-energy plant in Krakow, Poland (scheduled for completion in 2016). The boiler system will process up to 220,000 tons of municipal solid waste per year to produce both electricity and district heat. 
Supplying and installing the grate, boiler and balance of the Harlingen waste-to-energy plant, which treats municipal and other pre-treated waste for the Dutch province of Friesland (began operating in 2011). Overall process efficiency exceeds 80%.
Renewing and refurbishing the AVA Frankfurt Nordweststadt four-line waste incineration plant (began operating in 2008). Existing incineration lines were replaced with new ones comprising counter-reciprocating grate incinerators, waste heat boilers and flue-gas cleaning systems. The plant generates electricity and supplies North West Frankfurt with thermal energy.

Sewage sludge incineration (SSI) technologies

Doosan Lentjes delivers sewage sludge mono incineration technology based on the bubbling bed boiler principle. Solutions cover the entire process chain including dewatering and drying, incineration, heat recovery and power generation, flue gas cleaning, as well as, ash separation for further processing. Around 25 units have been provided in Germany and across Europe during the last decades.

Circulating fluidised bed (CFB) boilers
Doosan Lentjes designed and built the world's first CFB boiler featuring a "fluidized" bed heat "exchanger" (FBHE) in Germany, in 1982. The company has produced designs up to almost 300MWe (~700MWth) with a capability of up to 500MWe (~1300MWth). The company's CFB boilers generate power at more than 100 plants around the world.

Doosan Lentjes is now working in partnership with Doosan Heavy Industries to develop supercritical steam CFB technologies with up to 600MWe of power.

Since mid-2013, Doosan Lentjes has been working with E.ON’s coal-fired Provence power plant in Gardanne, France to convert the existing coal-fired boiler, built and installed by Doosan Lentjes in 1992, into a biomass unit, and to replace the existing steam turbines. The biomass unit will generate electricity from forest chips, green residues and recovered wood and is expected to provide energy for 440,000 households.

Air quality control systems (AQCS)
Doosan Lentjes develops wet limestone flue gas desulphurisation (FGD), seawater FGD and dry-circulating "fluidised" bed (CFB) technologies that allow power plants to meet strict emissions targets. It also supplies high and low pressure pulse jet fabric filters, and electrostatic precipitator de-dusters.
At Gheco One power plant, Thailand, Doosan Lentjes designed a seawater FGD system that makes use of seawater from the steam turbine unit. It has been operating since 2012.
In 2009, Doosan Lentjes fitted wet limestone FGD plants at Rugeley power station, UK to meet the European Large Combustion Plant Directive requiring a 94% removal rate of sulphurous compounds from flue gases.
Doosan Lentjes has installed over 280 wet FGD units and over 800 dedusting plants internationally.

History

References

External links
 Doosan Lentjes
 Doosan Power Systems
 Doosan Babcock Energy Germany
 Doosan Babcock Energy Polska

Manufacturing companies established in 1928
Engineering companies of the United Kingdom
1928 establishments in Germany
Energy companies established in 1928